Antonio Joaquín Dubé de Luque (Sevilla, 23 December 1943 - 7 November 2019) was a Spanish religious sculptor.

Biography 
He received artistic teaching from the painters Juan Miguel Sánchez, Eduardo Acosta and Miguel Pérez Aguilera, as well as the sculptor Manuel Echegoyán. His work consists mainly of carvings of a religious character in wood, many of which procession in different localities of Spain during Holy Week. He was also a posterist, painter, designer and restauraterist. He died at the age of seventy-five on November 7, 2019 at the Virgen del Rocío Hospital in Seville after a long illness.

Works 

 Santa María de Consolación (1969), titular de la Hermandad de La Sed (Sevilla).
 María Santísima de la Soledad Coronada (1972), titular de la Real Hermandad de la Vera-Cruz de Salteras (Sevilla).
 Virgen de la Paz (1974), titular de la Hermandad de la Borriquilla (Granada).
 Nuestra Señora del Amor (1977), titular de la Hermandad del Gran Poder San Fernando (Cádiz).
 Nuestra Señora de la Aurora (1978), titular de la Hermandad de La Resurrección (Sevilla).
 María Santísima de la Estrella (1980), titular de la Cofradía de nazarenos de Nuestro Padre Jesús de la Pasión y Mª Stma. de la Estrella, del Albayzin (Granada).
 Virgen de Lágrimas y Favores (1981), titular de las Reales Cofradías Fusionadas (Málaga).
 Virgen del Amor (1981), titular de la Cofradía de Jesús "El Rico" (Málaga).
 Virgen del Mayor Dolor (1982), titular de las Reales Cofradías Fusionadas (Málaga).
 Virgen de los Dolores en su Amparo y Misericordia (1983), titular de la Hermandad de la Santa Cruz (Málaga).
 Virgen del Patrocinio (1984), titular de la Hermandad de la Salutación (Málaga).
 Jesús Nazareno de la Salutación (1984), titular de la Hermandad de la Salutación (Málaga).
 Señor de los Reyes (1987), titular de Hermandad de la Vera Cruz (Córdoba).
 Señor Nazareno de la Santa Faz (1988), titular de Hermandad de la Santa Faz  (Córdoba).
 María Santísima del Mayor Dolor en su Soledad (1988), titular de la Hermandad de la Crucifixión (Málaga). 
 Nuestra Señora de la Esperanza (1989), titular Paso Morado Tabernas. (Tabernas, Almería).
 Virgen de la Victoria (1991), titular de la Cofradía del Resucitado (Ayamonte).
 Misterio de la Sagrada Cena (Señor de la Eucaristía (1995), secundarias (1995-2005)), y Nuestra Señora del Sagrario (1998), Cofradía de la Sagrada Cena, Cáceres.
 Cristo del Amor y Virgen de la Piedad (1995), conjunto escultórico de la Cofradía de la Piedad, Arahal, (Sevilla).
 Virgen de la Merced (1996), titular de la Cofradía del Prendimiento (Almería).
 Virgen de los Ángeles (1997), titular de la Cofradía de los Ángeles (Almería).
 Virgen de las Maravillas (1997), titular de la Asociación Las Maravillas (Sevilla).
 Bautismo de Jesús (2000), grupo escultórico que procesiona en la Semana Santa de Cuenca. 
 Jesús de la Pasión (2000), titular de la Hermandad de la Pasión (Plasencia, Cáceres).
 Jesús de la Salud (2002), titular de la Hermandad de la Borriquilla (Jaén).
 Virgen del Rosario (2002), titular de la Hermandad de la Pasión (Plasencia, Cáceres).
 Señor de la Sentencia, titular de la hermandad de la Macarena (Almería).
 Mº Santísima de la Esperanza Macarena, titular de la hermandad de la Macarena (Almería).
 Jesús de los Afligidos en su Humillación (2009), titular de la Asociación Las Maravillas (Sevilla).

References 

21st-century Spanish sculptors
20th-century Spanish sculptors
1943 births
2019 deaths
People from Seville